Edoardo Soleri (born 19 October 1997) is an Italian footballer who plays as a striker for  club Palermo.

Club career
Born in Rome, Soleri joined Roma's youth setup in 2013, from SSD Futbolclub. He was subsequently included in the Primavera squad, and also featured in the 2015–16 and 2016–17 UEFA Youth Leagues.

Soleri made his professional debut on 29 September 2015, coming on as a late substitute for Alessandro Florenzi in a 3–2 away loss against FC BATE Borisov, for the season's UEFA Champions League.

On 30 June 2017, after finishing his formation, Soleri was loaned to Serie B side Spezia for one year. He made his debut for the club on 12 August, playing the last 24 minutes in a 2–0 Coppa Italia away loss against Sassuolo.

On 19 January 2018, after only five league appearances, Soleri's loan was cut short. The following day, he joined Spanish Segunda División side UD Almería on loan until June.

In July 2018, Soleri signed to Eerste Divisie club Almere City on loan.

In January 2019, Soleri signed to Braga on loan until the end of the season.

On 10 July 2019, Soleri signed a 3-years contract with Serie C club Padova. On 6 January 2021, he joined Monopoli on loan.

On 16 July 2021, he was loaned to Palermo. In his time at Palermo, he became the second-best goalscorer behind Matteo Brunori, marking a total ten goals in the regular season, all of them as a substitute. He confirmed his "super-sub" reputation by scoring the first of two Palermo goals in the promotion playoff quarter final second leg against Virtus Entella, a 2–2 home draw that allowed the Sicilians to qualify for the semifinals, as well as scoring the final goal in a 3–0 away win at Feralpisalò in the semifinal first leg.

On 16 June 2022, Palermo exercised their option to make the transfer permanent. Later in August 2022, Soleri signed a contract extension until 30 June 2025 with the Rosanero. On 5 February 2023, he scored his first career goal in the Serie B league, the winning one in a 2–1 home win against third-placed Reggina.

Career statistics

Club

References

External links

1997 births
Living people
Footballers from Rome
Italian footballers
Association football forwards
Serie B players
Serie C players
A.S. Roma players
Spezia Calcio players
Calcio Padova players
S.S. Monopoli 1966 players
Palermo F.C. players
Segunda División players
UD Almería players
Eerste Divisie players
Tweede Divisie players
Almere City FC players
Italian expatriate footballers
Italian expatriate sportspeople in Spain
Italian expatriate sportspeople in the Netherlands
Expatriate footballers in Spain
Expatriate footballers in the Netherlands